Adhamh (Adam in the Irish language) may refer to:

 Adhamh Ó Cianáin (died 1373), Irish historian and genealogist
 Leabhar Adhamh Ó Cianáin, Medieval manuscript

See also
 Àdhamh, Scottish Gaelic form of the name

Irish-language masculine given names